Newcastle School for Boys, or NSB,  is a private school for boys aged 3–18 in Gosforth, Newcastle-upon-Tyne, England. It has approximately 400 students.

History
NSB was formed in 2005 with the merger of Ascham House School and Newlands Preparatory School.

Chris Hutchinson was appointed Headmaster of NSB in 2007. A major extension to the senior school, which is housed in the large, Victorian-era former home of colliery owner, John Henry Reah, was completed in 2008. The Sixth Form accepted its first students in September 2009.

David Tickner was appointed as Headmaster in April 2012, and the school acquired additional premises opposite the Senior School to house a purpose-designed Sixth Form Centre in 2017.

Admissions 
The Junior School is located in two buildings, which previously accommodated Ascham House School, on West Avenue, and caters for boys in Nursery and Years 1 to 6. The Senior School is located in a building, which previously accommodated Newlands Preparatory School, in Moor Road South.

School Life
Boys are sorted into one of four houses upon their arrival. They stay in these houses for the remainder of their time at the school, and partake in weekly hymn practice as a house, and inter-house competitions such as rugby, cricket, and choral. Sports played at NSB include rugby, cricket, football and Hockey, with regular fixtures played against other northern schools, such as RGS Newcastle, Dame Allens, Durham, Yarm, and Ampleforth.

Inspections
The School was last inspected by the Independent Schools Inspectorate in 2017. All standards were met.

References

External links
Official site

Boys' schools in Tyne and Wear
Private schools in Newcastle upon Tyne
Educational institutions established in 2005
2005 establishments in England